; Horse racing in Japan is a popular equestrian sport, with more than 21,000 horse races held each year. There are three types of racing that take place in Japan - flat racing, jump racing, and Ban'ei Racing (also called Draft Racing).

In Japan, horse racing is organized by the Japan Racing Association (JRA) and the National Association of Racing (NAR). The JRA is responsible for horseracing events at ten major racecourses in metropolitan areas, while the NAR is responsible for various local horseracing events throughout Japan. This system of administration of horse racing is unique to Japan.

Japan's top stakes races are run in the spring, autumn, and winter; the top race is the Japan Cup.

History
The history of equestrian sports and horse racing in Japan goes back many centuries, but it was not until the Spring of 1862 that the first horse race in a recognizably European format was organized by a group of British residents on an area of drained marshland just outside the recently opened treaty port of Yokohama.

After a series of informal races were held on the location often referred to as the Swamp Ground, in 1866 the Negishi Racecourse was constructed to provide a more permanent site adjacent to the expanding Yamate residential district. Initially intended as an entertainment venue for the foreign community, the racecourse rapidly became popular with Japanese society; the Emperor Meiji himself visiting on 14 separate occasions. The popularity of horse racing spread rapidly in the vicinity of other treaty ports; the Kobe Jockey Club following the Yokohama precedent, was established in 1870.

Early in the development of the sport Japan adopted an integrated approach to both thoroughbred breeding and racing. The close financially supportive relationship between these two industries enabled both to grow significantly during the post Second World War economic boom.  The Japan Racing Association was formally established in 1954.

The Japan Cup, one of the richest horse races in the world, was inaugurated in 1981.  Run at Tokyo's Fuchu Racecourse on the last Sunday in November, it continues to attract thoroughbreds from all over the world.

Japan Racing Association

The JRA manages the ten main tracks in Japan. Races at these tracks are called Chuo Keiba (meaning "central horse racing"). It provides some of the richest racing in the world. , a typical JRA maiden race for three-year-olds carried a purse of ¥9.55 million (about US$112,000), with ¥5 million (about US$59,000) paid to the winner. Purses for graded stakes races begin at ¥74.6 million (about US$882,000).

The country's most prominent race is the Grade 1 Japan Cup, a 2,400 m (about 1½ mile) invitational turf race run every November at Tokyo Racecourse for a purse of ¥476 million (about US$5.6 million), which used to be the richest turf race in the world. Other noted stakes races include the February Stakes, Takamatsunomiya Kinen, Yasuda Kinen, Takarazuka Kinen, Arima Kinen, and the Tenno Sho races run in the spring and autumn. The Satsuki Sho, Tokyo Yushun, and Kikuka Sho comprise the Japanese Triple Crown of Thoroughbred Racing.

National Association of Racing 

The NAR control what is called Chihou Keiba (meaning "local horse racing"). The fifteen Chihou Keiba tracks are operated by municipal racing authorities and run under the affiliation of the National Association of Racing (NAR). These races are smaller than JRA races, with the exception of Minami-kanto Keiba (a group of four tracks - Oi, Urawa, Funabashi and Kawasaki). All tracks of Minami-kanto Keiba are located in the Kanto region, including many large cities.

Unlike the JRA, the NAR mainly organize dirt graded events (except for Morioka Racecourse which has turf), of which the JRA has few, including the international Grade 1 race, Tokyo Daishōten, and a number of domestic Grade 1 events like Teio sho, Kashiwa Kinen and the Japan Breeders' Cup series.

The global financial crisis has caused serious problems for Chihou Keiba. Local government finances have suffered from growing cumulative deficits, leading some local governments to discuss whether to keep or close their horseracing facilities. In 2011, Arao City in Kumamoto prefecture decided to close its track, which was the oldest one in the NAR. Fukuyama City's racetrack was closed 2013.

Restrictions

Horses belonging to the JRA cannot participate in NAR events unless they are designated "exchange races" or "Dirt-Graded races". The reverse applies to NAR horses, although they can participate in JRA Grade 1 turf events by either getting qualified in respective step races or winning a dirt/international Grade 1 event. Horse transfer between the JRA and the NAR is possible. Oguri Cap, the JRA Hall of Fame horse and Inari One, winner of Arima Kinen in 1989, both debuted in NAR before transfer to JRA.

Although JRA racing is considered to be more popular and more competitive, sometimes NAR horses have represented Japan in races outside Japan instead of JRA horses. For example, Cosmo Bulk (from Hokkaido Keiba) won the Singapore Airlines International Cup in 2006 as a NAR horse.

As protection for the Japanese breeding industry, horses which were not bred in Japan (or in a few cases, not having a Japanese sire) were, in the past, usually barred from many important races, including the Triple Crown. The trend began to change in the early 90s, when progeny of imported stallions, particularly Tony Bin (Italy), Brian's Time and Sunday Silence(both US), had remarkable success in both racing and breeding. This was particularly the case with Sunday Silence, who was the leading sire for 10 years (his progeny would succeed him for another 3 years). Sunday Silence sired winners in Grade 1 races outside Japan (one each in the Hong Kong Vase, Hong Kong Mile and Dubai Sheema Classic) and a number of graded races all over the world. Since the mid-2000s, most of the horses in Japan, including many overseas group race winner, had sires bred in Japan. Some of them also have a successful breeding record outside Japan - the daughter of Deep Impact, Beauty Parlour won the French classic race, the Poule d'Essai des Pouliches in 2012. The son of Hat Trick, Dabirsim was honored with Cartier Two-Year-Old Colt Award winner in 2011. Since the early 2000s, most of the bars on non-Japanese bred horses and sires have been lifted, although Japanese-bred horses are still considered to be more successful than imported horse in Japanese racing nowadays.

Jumps racing

Japan's top jump race is the Nakayama Grand Jump, run every April at Nakayama Racecourse. Instead of running over a large course as is the case in other countries, the course for the 4,250 m (about 2⅝ mile) Nakayama Grand Jump follows a twisted path on the inside portion of Nakayama's racing ovals. The race carries a purse of ¥142.5 million (about US$1.68 million). In Japan, jump racing is generally less popular than flat racing. Racecourses do not hold more than two jump races in a single day.

Every Japanese jump horse has experience of running on the flat. Usually, all of them aim for success on the flat. They are only trained for jumping after they have retired from the flat. In Japan, unlike Europe, very few horses are bred specifically for jumping.

Famous jockeys
The top jockey in Japan is Yutaka Take, who is a multiple champion in his homeland and regularly rides Japanese horses in stakes races around the world. Yutaka Take was the regular jockey for Deep Impact, the 2005 Japan Triple Crown winner and JRA's two time Horse of the Year (2005–06), as well as Kitasan Black, another horse who was awarded the Horse of the Year two years in a row (2016-17). 

From 1994, the JRA gives short-term riding licenses (allowing maximum of 3 months in a year) to foreign jockeys. Many world-class jockeys take an active part in Japanese horse racing using these short-term licenses, including Olivier Peslier, Christophe Soumillon, Mirco Demuro (elder brother of Cristian Demuro, who has also participated in JRA races), Christophe Lemaire, Craig Williams, Ryan Moore, Joao Moreira and Oisin Murphy.

And from 2014, the JRA allows full-year licenses to foreign jockeys, with Demuro and Lemaire taking these licenses in 2015. Lemaire went on to become the leading jockey in four years straight, from 2017 to 2021.

Victoire Pisa won the richest race, Dubai World Cup in 2011, under Demuro.

Other notable jockeys:
Yuichi Fukunaga - 2013 JRA leading jockey, jockey of Contrail and Just A Way, turned trainer in 2023
Yoichi Fukunaga - father of Yuichi
Kenichi Ikezoe - jockey of Orfevre
Koshiro Take - younger brother of Yutaka, turned trainer in 2018
Kunihiko Take - father of Yutaka and Koshiro, turned trainer in 1985
Takemi Kaga
Yukio Okabe - jockey of Symboli Rudolf and Taiki Shuttle
Ryuji Wada - jockey of T M Opera O
Yasunari Iwata - debuted in the NAR. Melbourne Cup winner, 2011 and 2012 JRA leading jockey
Fumio Matoba - NAR jockey with most career wins in Japan
Keita Tosaki - debuted in the NAR. 2014, 2015 and 2016 JRA leading jockey
Masayoshi Ebina
Yuga Kawada - 2022 JRA leading jockey

Major horse races 
(Note on Japanese words in the names; Kinen:Memorial, Hai:Cup, Sho:Prize, Yushun:excellent horse)

February
February Stakes (Dirt 1600m) 

March
Takamatsunomiya Kinen (Turf 1200m)
Osaka Hai (Turf 2000m)

April
Oka Sho (Turf 1600m)
Satsuki Sho (Turf 2000m) - the first leg for the Triple Crown

May
Tenno Sho (Spring) (Turf 3200m)
NHK Mile Cup (Turf 1600m)
Victoria Mile (Turf 1600m)
Yushun Himba (Japanese Oaks) (Turf 2400m)
Tokyo Yushun (Japanese Derby) (Turf 2400m)  - the second leg for the Triple Crown

June
Yasuda Kinen (Turf 1600m)
Takarazuka Kinen (Grand Prix)  (Turf 2200m)

September
Sprinters Stakes (Turf 1200m)

October
Shuka Sho (Turf 2000m)
Kikka Sho (Turf 3000m)  - the final leg for the Triple Crown
Tenno Sho (Autumn) (Turf 2000m)

November
Queen Elizabeth II Cup (Turf 2200m)
Mile Championship (Turf 1600m)
Japan Cup (Turf 2400m) - the richest purse race in Japan

December
Champions Cup (Dirt 1800m)
Hanshin Juvenile Fillies (Turf 1600m)
Asahi Hai Futurity Stakes (Turf 1600m)
Arima Kinen (Grand Prix) (Turf 2500m) - the world's biggest betting race
Hopeful Stakes (Turf 2000m)
Tokyo Daishōten（Dirt 2000m）- the only NAR race with international Grade I rating

Japan Road to the Kentucky Derby
The following races are designated as preliminaries for the Kentucky Derby.
November: Cattleya Sho (Dirt 1600m) 
December: Zen-Nippon Nisai Yushun (Dirt 1600m)
February: Hyacinth Stakes (Dirt 1600m) 
March: Fukuryu Stakes (Dirt 1800m)

See also
 Bajutsu
 Sunday Silence - the leading sire 1995-2007 in Japan.
 Deep Impact - undefeated Japanese Triple Crown horse in 2005 and the leading sire 2012-2020.
 Orfevre - twice runner-up in the Prix de l'Arc de Triomphe, 2012 and 2013, each time losing to a filly bearing lighter weight.

External links 
 Horse Racing in Japan

References